Karim Aïnouz (born 17 January 1966) is a Brazilian film director and visual artist.

Career
Karim Aïnouz was born to a Brazilian mother and an Algerian father. He is a film director, screenwriter and visual artist. Aïnouz's feature debut, Madame Satã, premiered in 2002 at the Cannes Film Festival, Un Certain Regard. His following films, O Céu de Suely (Love for Sale), and Viajo porque preciso, volto porque te amo (I Travel Because I Have to, I Come Back Because I Love You), co-directed with Marcelo Gomes, premiered at the Venice Film Festival – Orizzonti, in 2006 and 2009. 

In 2011, O Abismo Prateado (Silver Cliff) was presented in the Directors' Fortnight Cannes and won Best Director at the Rio de Janeiro International Film Festival.
 
In television, Aïnouz directed Alice, a 13 episode fiction series for HBO Latin America. His short films and installations have been shown at numerous venues including The Whitney Museum of American Art, the São Paulo Biennial, the Sharjah Biennial and Videobrasil.

As creative advisor and lecturer, Aïnouz has been invited to numerous Screenwriters Labs and institutions such as Princeton University, Wexner Center for the Arts, MIT, EICTV among others. Karim Aïnouz has been developing, alongside fellow filmmakers Marcelo Gomes and Sérgio Machado, The Center for Audiovisual Narratives in partnership with State authorities of Ceará, Brazil. Among other activities, they coordinate and work as creative advisors to the Screenwriters Lab, a one year program committed to the development of a new generation of filmmakers, providing support throughout their projects. Since 2017, Aïnouz is a member of the Academy of Motion Picture Arts and Sciences.

Karim Aïnouz latest feature film, the documentary Zentralflughafen THF, premiered at the 68th Berlinale – Panorama, won the Amnesty International Film Award, and has been screened in over 10 festivals. His previous feature Praia do Futuro (Futuro Beach), had its world premiere at the 64th Berlinale Competition.

In 2019 he released Invisible Life, an adaptation of the novel A Vida Invisivel de Eurídice Gusmão written by Martha Batalha, depicting the life of two sisters. The film takes place in the Rio de Janeiro of the 1950s.

Filmography

As director 
 TBA - Firebrand
 2021 – Mariner of the Mountains (O marinheiro das montanhas)
2019 – The Invisible Life of Eurídice Gusmão – drama, HD video, color.
 2018 – Zentralflughafen THF – documentary, HD video, color, 97min.
 2015 – Velázquez – Wild Realism, documentary, HD video, color, 52 min
 2014 – Sunday – documentary, HD video, color, 26min.
 2014 – Futuro Beach – drama, 35mm, color, 106min.
 2014 – Cathedrals of Culture – episode Centre Pompidou – documentary, 3D, color, 165 min.
 2011 – Destricted.br experimental, 16mm, color, 14min.
 2011 – Your Empathic City, video installation, 3-channel HD video, 24 spotlights, color filter foil
 2011 – The Silver Cliff, drama, 35mm, color, 84 min.
 2011 – Sunny Lane, visual essay, super 8/digital, color, 12 min.
 2010 – Neverquiet, collective film, drama, color, 63 min.
 2009 – I Travel Because I Have to, I Come Back Because I Love You co-directed with Marcelo Gomes drama, 35mm, color, 75 min.
 2008 – Alice, TV series for HBO Latin America
 2006 – Suely in the Sky, drama, 35mm, color, 88 min.
 2004 – Se fosse tudo sempre assim, video installation, super 8/digital, color.
 2004 – Sertão de Acrílico Azul Piscina, documentary, super 8/digital, color, 26min.
 2002 – Madame Satã, drama, 35mm, color, 105 min.
 2000 – Rifa-me, drama, 35 mm, color, 28 min.
 1998 – Les Ballons des Bairros, documentary for France 3, video, 26 min.
 1996 – Hic Habitat Felicitas, 35mm, color, 26 min.
 1994 – Paixão Nacional, 16mm, color, 9 min.
 1993 – Seams, documentary, 16mm, color, 29 min.
 1992 – O Preso, drama, video, color, 19 min.

As screenwriter 
 2014 – Sunday – documentary, HD video, color, 26min.
 2014 – Praia do Futuro – drama, 35mm, color, 106min.
 2014 – Cathedrals of Culture – episode Centre Pompidou – documentary, 3D, color, 165 min.
 2011 – Destricted.br experimental, 16mm, color, 14min.
 2011 – The Silver Cliff, drama, 35mm, color, 84 min.
 2011 – Sunny Lane, visual essay, super 8/digital, color, 12 min.
 2010 – I Travel Because I Have To, I Come Back Because I Love You co-directed with Marcelo Gomes drama, 35mm, color, 75 min.
 2006 – Love for Sale, drama, 35mm, color, 88 min.
 2005 – Cinema, Aspirins and Vultures, drama, 35mm, color, 104 min.
 2005 – Lower City, drama, 35mm, color, 93 min.
 2004 – Sertão de Acrílico Azul Piscina, documentary, super 8/digital, color, 26min.
 2002 – Madame Satã, drama, 35mm, color, 105 min.
 2001 – Behind the Sun, drama, 35mm, color, 105 min.
 1996 – Hic Habitat Felicitas, 35mm, color, 26 min.
 1994 – Paixão Nacional, 16mm, color, 9 min.
 1993 – Seams, documentary, 16mm, color, 29 min.
 1992 – O Preso, drama, video, color, 19 min.

Awards
 2018: Amnesty International Film Prize, Berlinale, for Zentralflughafen THF
 2011: Second Grand Coral Award, Havana Film Festival, for The Silver Cliff
 2011: Award for Best Director, Rio International Film Festival, for The Silver Cliff
 2010: Grand Prix Coup de Coeur, 22º Rencontres Cinémas d'Amérique Latin (Toulouse/France), for I Travel Because I Have To, I Come Back Because I Love You co-directed with Marcelo Gomes. 
 2009: Award for Best Director, Rio International Film Festival, for I Travel Because I Have To, I Come Back Because I Love You
 2009: FIPRESCI Award, Havana Film Festival, for I Travel Because I Have To, I Come Back Because I Love You
 2009: Third Grand Coral Award, Havana Film Festival, for I Travel Because I Have To, I Come Back Because I Love You
 2006: FIPRESCI Award, 47th Thessaloniki International Film Festival, for Love for Sale
 2006: Grand Coral Award, Havana Film Festival, for Love for Sale
 2006: Award for Best Film, Rio International Film Festival, for Love for Sale
 2006: Award for Best Director, Rio International Film Festival, for Love for Sale
 2002: Gold Hugo, Chicago International Film Festival, for Madame Satã
 2002: Award for Best Director, Biarritz Film Festival, for Madame Satã
 2002: Award for Best Director, São Paulo Association of Art Critics Awards, for Madame Satã
 1997: Award for Best Short, Ann Arbor Film Festival, for Seams
 1994: Award for Best Short, Atlanta Film Festival, for Seams

References

External links

1966 births
Living people
People from Fortaleza
Brazilian people of Algerian descent
Brazilian film directors
Brazilian artists
Algerian people of Brazilian descent